The Commissionaires Long Service Medal  is a Canadian service medal for members of the Canadian Corps of Commissionaires.  The medal honours 12 years of exemplary service by members of the Canadian Corps of Commissionaires. 
A Clasp is awarded for each additional period of 5 years service up to a maximum of 3 clasps. The medal is accompanied by a certificate. There is no Post Nominal entitlement accompanying receipt of the medal.

This medal was first approved by the Secretary of State on 20 August 1948 although a slightly different form. An Order in Council of 26 February 1998 officially incorporated it into the Canadian Honours system.

Civil awards and decorations of Canada
Law enforcement awards and honors
1948 establishments in Canada
Awards established in 1948
Long service medals
Long and Meritorious Service Medals of Britain and the Commonwealth